Eisenschitz is a surname. Notable people with the surname include:

 Bernard Eisenschitz (born 1944), French film critic, subtitler, and historian
 Willy Eisenschitz (1889–1974), French painter of Austrian origin